This electoral calendar 2004 lists the national/federal direct elections held in 2004 in the de jure and de facto sovereign states and their dependent territories. Referendums are included, although they are not elections. By-elections are not included.

January
 4 January: Georgia, president
 20 January: Faroe, parliament

February

March
 7 March: Greece, parliament
 14 March: Russia, president
 14 March: Spain, house and senate
 20 March: Taiwan, president
 21 March: El Salvador, president
 21 March: Malaysia, parliament
 23 March: Antigua and Barbuda, Parliament
 28 March: Georgia, parliament
 28 March: Guinea-Bissau, parliament
 21 and 28 March: Guadeloupe, parliament
 21 and 28 March: Martinique, parliament
 21 and 28 March: French Guiana, parliament
 21 and 28 March: Reunion, parliament
 21 and 28 March: Mayotte, parliament

April
 2 April: Sri Lanka, parliament
 5 April: Indonesia, parliament
 8 April: Algeria, President
 14 April: South Africa, parliament
 15 April: South Korea, parliament
 3 and 17 April:: Slovakia, president
 21 April: Guernsey, parliament
 18 April: and April 25: Comoros, parliament
 25 April: Austria, president
 25 April: Equatorial Guinea, parliament
 14 April: and April 28: Macedonia, president

May
 2 May: Panama, president and parliament
 20 February and 7 May: Iran, parliament
 9 May: New Caledonia, parliament
 20 and 26 April: India, parliament
 5 and 10 May: India, parliament
 10 May: Philippines, president, house and senate
 16 May: Dominican Republic, president
 18 May: Malawi, president and parliament
 23 May: French Polynesia, parliament
 23 May: South Ossetia, parliament

June
 10–11 June: European Union, parliament
 13 June: European Union, parliament
 13 June: Luxembourg, parliament
 13 and 27 June: Lithuania, president
 13 and 27 June: Serbia, president
 26 June: Iceland, president
 27 June: Mongolia, parliament
 28 June: Canada, parliament

July
 6 July: Vanuatu, parliament
 11 July: Japan, senate

September
 7 September: Cook Island, parliament
 5 July and 20 September: Indonesia, president

October
 19 September and 3 October: Kazakhstan, parliament
 3 October: Abkhazia, President
 3 October: Slovenia, parliament
 9 October: Afghanistan, President
 9 October: Australia, Legislative
 11 October: Cameroon, president
 17 October: Belarus, Parliament and referendum
 20 October: Norfolk, parliament
 23 October: Kosovo, parliament
 23 October: Nauru, parliament
 10 and 24 October: Lithuania, parliament
 24 October: Tunisia, president and parliament
 25 October: Saint Kitts and Nevis, parliament
 30 October: Botswana, parliament
 31 October: Ukraine, president
 31 October: Uruguay, president and parliament

November
 2 November: United States, President, every member of the House of Representatives, and one-third of the Senate
 2 November: Puerto Rico, Governor, House and Senate
 2 November: US Virgin Islands, legislature
 2 November: American Samoa, Governor and Legislature
 2 November: Palau, President, House and Senate
 5–6 November: Czech Republic, senate
 13 November and 4 December: Niger, president and parliament
 15–16 November: Namibia, president and parliament
 28 November: Romania, President, Senate and Chamber

December
 1–2 December: Mozambique, president and parliament
 7 and 28 December: Ghana, president and parliament
 11 December: Taiwan, parliament
 12 December: Romania, president 2nd round
 19 December: Turkmenistan, parliament
 21 December and 4 January: Croatia, president
 24 December: Pitcairn Islands, parliament
 26 December: Uzbekistan, parliament

 
Political timelines of the 2000s by year